Victor Herbert Melodies, Vol. 2 is a compilation album of phonograph records , recorded by Bing Crosby, Frances Langford, Florence George and Rudy Vallee celebrating the music of Victor Herbert. Most of the recordings were made in December 1938 by Decca Records, who were probably aware that a film called The Great Victor Herbert was being made by Paramount Pictures. An album titled Victor Herbert Melodies, Vol. 1 had been issued earlier in 1939. Victor Young and His Concert Orchestra provided the musical accompaniment to all of the tracks.

Track listing
These newly issued songs were featured in a 5-disc 78 rpm album set, Decca Album No. A-72.

Disc 1: (2680)

Disc 2: (2681)

Disc 3: (2682)

Disc 4: (2683)

Disc 5: (2684)

References

1939 compilation albums
Decca Records compilation albums
Bing Crosby compilation albums
Frances Langford compilation albums
Rudy Vallée compilation albums